"The Fever" is episode seventeen of the American television anthology series The Twilight Zone. It originally aired on January 29, 1960 on CBS. The complete, original text for this story was run in the debut issue of Harvey Kurtzman’s Help!, cover dated August, 1960.

Opening narration

Plot
Franklin Gibbs and his wife Flora go to Las Vegas because she won a slogan contest. He detests gambling, but his wife is excited about their vacation. In a casino, she puts a nickel in a slot machine and Franklin admonishes her for wasting money. She convinces him to let her pull the arm since she already put the money in, but wins nothing on the spin. Happy that his point was made, he implores her to go back to their room so they can get ready for dinner. As they walk, Franklin is given a coin by a drunk man who makes him use it in another machine. He wins and tells his wife that they should keep the winnings and not lose it back like other people. As they depart, Franklin believes he hears the slot machine calling his name.

He continues to hear this as he tries to sleep. He gets out of bed, telling his wife he cannot keep "tainted" money, and that he is going to get rid of it by putting it back in the machine. Later, Flora goes to the casino and finds him playing the machine obsessively. When Flora tries to coax him to stop, he declares that he has lost so much that he has to try to win some of it back. He becomes enraged when she presses him to leave; he declares that the machine is "inhuman," that it "teases you, [...] sucks you in." The casino workers watch and talk about him as he constantly plays and ignores his wife's pleas to go to bed. When Franklin puts his last dollar into the machine, it malfunctions and will not spin. He loses his temper, knocks the machine over, and is taken screaming out of the casino. 

Later in bed, Franklin tells Flora that it was about to pay off, but deliberately broke down so that it would not have to give him his money. He then hears the machine again calling his name. Then, to his horror, he sees the slot machine coming down the hallway toward their room, pursuing him; but Flora cannot see it. The machine hounds him toward the window, repeating his name over and over. He crashes through the glass and falls to his death. The police stand over his body, noting that his wife had stated that he had not slept in 24 hours. A casino manager comments that he's "seen a lot of 'em get hooked before, but never like him." The last scene shows Franklin's last dollar rolling up and spinning out flat near his outstretched, dead hand. The camera pans in the direction from which the coin had come, and there sits the slot machine, "smiling".

Closing narration

Episode notes 
In Serling: The Rise and Twilight of Television's Last Angry Man, Gordon F. Sander wrote, "Serling celebrated the signing of his new show, The Twilight Zone by spending a weekend in Las Vegas. While Carol Serling was having good luck nearby, he became enslaved by a merciless one-armed bandit, an incident he would turn into one of his first Twilight Zone episodes."

In future episodes, the slot machine was used in "A Nice Place to Visit" and "The Prime Mover".

This is one of several episodes from Season One with its opening title sequence plastered over with the opening for Season Two. This was done during the Summer of 1961 to help the Season One shows fit in with the new look the show had taken during the following season. This is also one of three Season One episodes with Marius Constant's theme instead of Bernard Herrmann's over the closing credits.

References

Further reading
Sander, Gordon F.: Serling: The Rise And Twilight of Television's Last Angry Man. New York: Penguin Books, 1992. 
Zicree, Marc Scott: The Twilight Zone Companion.  Sillman-James Press, 1982 (second edition) 
DeVoe, Bill. (2008). Trivia from The Twilight Zone. Albany, GA: Bear Manor Media. 
Grams, Martin. (2008). The Twilight Zone: Unlocking the Door to a Television Classic. Churchville, MD: OTR Publishing.

External links
 

1960 American television episodes
Television episodes about death
The Twilight Zone (1959 TV series season 1) episodes
Television episodes written by Rod Serling
Television episodes set in Las Vegas
Television episodes about gambling